The 1928 West Virginia Mountaineers football team was an American football team that represented West Virginia University as an independent during the 1928 college football season. In its fourth season under head coach Ira Rodgers, the team compiled an 8–2 record and outscored opponents by a total of 152 to 38. The team played its home games at Mountaineer Field in Morgantown, West Virginia. Clarence Keefer was the team captain.

Schedule

References

West Virginia
West Virginia Mountaineers football seasons
West Virginia Mountaineers football